Serdal Güvenç (born 20 May 1984) is a Turkish football player who was born in Maaseik, Belgium and played for Turkey U21. He last played for Verbroedering Geel-Meerhout. He began his career as a defender for Fortuna Sittard with his younger brother Emrullah Güvenç.

References

1984 births
Living people
Turkish footballers
Turkey under-21 international footballers
Turkish expatriate sportspeople in the Netherlands
K. Patro Eisden Maasmechelen players
Lommel S.K. players
TOP Oss players
Akhisarspor footballers
Kırşehirspor footballers
Fortuna Sittard players
Belgian people of Turkish descent
Association football defenders